Barelaked Nadies is the second DVD release from Canadian band Barenaked Ladies, though it is the first full-length release. It is a compilation of their music videos from 1991–2002, with one exclusion: the video for the Rock Spectacle version of "Brian Wilson" is missing, and the Gordon version is chronologically in its place. The title of the video is a mashup of the name "Barenaked Ladies". The DVD includes video commentary on each video from the band, recorded at the Four Seasons Hotel in Toronto, Ontario, Canada, as well as live concert footage taken from the 2001 Great Guinness Toast pay-per-view. The DVD-ROM also includes a karaoke feature for the song "One Week".

Video listing

Live performance:
 One Week
 Lovers in a Dangerous Time
 What a Good Boy
 Pinch Me
 Too Little Too Late
 Falling for the First Time
 Brian Wilson

Canadian musical films
Barenaked Ladies video albums
2002 video albums
Music video compilation albums
2002 compilation albums
English-language Canadian films
2000s English-language films
2000s Canadian films